The 2023 Mississippi House of Representatives election is scheduled to be held on Tuesday, November 7, 2023, to elect all 122 members of the Mississippi House of Representatives to four-year terms. It will be held concurrently with elections for all statewide offices and the Mississippi State Senate. Primary elections will take place on August 8.

Background 
In the 2019 Mississippi Legislature elections, Republicans expanded their majorities in both chambers to 75 in the House and 36 in the Senate. They currently have 77 members in the House, five votes short of a two-thirds supermajority, after elected Democrats Kevin Horan and Jon Ray Lancaster switched parties.

The 2023 election will be the first election held under new district maps following redistricting as a result of the 2020 Census.

Overview

Special elections
One special election was held on January 10, 2023, with a runoff on January 31, 2023, to fill a vacancy in District 23. Incumbent Charles Beckett resigned on September 22, 2022, to become executive director of the Mississippi Public Utilities Staff. As with all Mississippi special elections, party labels did not appear on the ballot. The winner, Perry Bailey, belongs to the Republican Party.

Results by district

See also 
 2023 United States state legislative elections
 2023 Mississippi State Senate election

References 

Mississippi House of Representatives
House of Representatives